Gavin James Creel (born April 18, 1976) is an American actor, singer, and songwriter best known for his work in musical theater. Creel made his Broadway debut in 2002 in the leading role of Jimmy in Thoroughly Modern Millie before starring as Claude in the 2009 Broadway revival of Hair, both Tony Award-nominated performances. From 2012–2015, he starred as Elder Price in The Book of Mormon; he received a Laurence Olivier Award for originating the role in the West End version of the musical and has played the role in the US National Tour and on Broadway. In 2017, he received a Tony Award for his performance as Cornelius Hackl in Broadway's Hello, Dolly!.

Other stage credits of his include La Cage aux Folles (2004), She Loves Me (2016), Waitress (2019), and Into the Woods (2022) on Broadway, Mary Poppins (2006) and Waitress (2020) in the West End, and the national tours of Fame (1998), Flashdance (2012), and Into the Woods (2023). Primarily a theater actor, his most notable screen acting role is as Bill in Eloise at the Plaza and its Christmas-themed sequel.

Early life
Creel was born in Findlay, Ohio. He attended Findlay High School, graduating in 1994. He received his Bachelor of Fine Arts in musical theatre at the University of Michigan School of Music, Theatre & Dance in 1998.

Career

1997–2002: Early career 
Creel began his professional career in regional theater. Some of his earliest credits are as part of the resident cast of Pittsburgh CLO, a repertory theater, for their 1997 and 1998 seasons; mostly ensemble roles, some of his eight productions there included Kiss Me Kate, La Cage aux Folles, and On the Town. Other stock theater credits around this time include productions in Massachusetts and New York state.

Following college graduation, Creel played Nick Piazza in the opening cast of 1998 national tour of Fame. In 1998–1999, the tour performed in cities including Toronto, Washington, D.C., and Chicago. Following the tour, he continued to perform in regional theater before moving to New York City in the early 2000s. In 2001, he was the swing in the original off-Broadway production of Bat Boy: The Musical. He also took part in the 2001 workshop of Spring Awakening.

2002–2012: Thoroughly Modern Millie and Hair 
In 2002, Creel made his Broadway debut in the original production Thoroughly Modern Millie, originating the role of Jimmy Smith opposite Sutton Foster's Millie Dillmount. A breakthrough performance, he was nominated for the Tony Award for Best Performance by a Leading Actor in a Musical. 

In February 2003, Creel played Prince Eric in a workshop for Disney's stage adaptation of The Little Mermaid.

After he departed Thoroughly Modern Millie in April 2003, he performed in the original Chicago production of Stephen Sondheim's Road Show, then titled Bounce, recorded the original cast album for Bright Lights, Big City, among other productions and workshops. Of note, he made his screen acting debut in the 2003 film Eloise at the Plaza and its follow-up Eloise at Christmastime as Bill.

He returned to Broadway in 2004 in the revival La Cage aux Folles. He played Jean-Michel throughout the production. In 2006, he made his West End debut in Mary Poppins. He replaced Bert in the original production. Also in 2006, he released his debut studio album Goodtimenation.

He returned to Broadway in 2009 in the revival of Hair. For his starring role of Claude, he received his second Tony Award nomination for Best Actor in a Musical. He and the rest of the cast performed in London through 2010 when the production transferred to the West End. Following Hair, he starred in the world premiere of Prometheus Bound and the original US tour of the Flashdance musical; the national tour was expected to function as a pre-Broadway production but did not transfer.

2012–present: The Book of Mormon, Hello Dolly!, and Into the Woods 
From 2012 until 2015, Creel starred in a series of productions of The Book of Mormon. He first starred as Elder Price in the First National Tour of the show in 2012. He subsequently originated the role in the musical's original West End production; for this performance, he was awarded Best Actor in a Musical at the 2014 Laurence Olivier Award, the most prestigious theatrical awards in the United Kingdom. Following his West End run, he returned to the touring production for a number of months before joining the Broadway cast in 2015.

Creel played the suave salesman Steven Kodaly, opposite Jane Krakowski, in the 2016 Broadway revival of She Loves Me. The show was a critical success and the production became the first Broadway show ever to be live-streamed. Since then, the recording has been part of the PBS series Great Performances.

In 2017, he began playing Cornelius Hackl in the Broadway revival of Hello, Dolly! starring Bette Midler. For his role, Creel was awarded the 2017 Tony Award for Best Actor in a Featured Role in a Musical. 

In 2019, Creel assumed the role of Dr. Pomatter in the Broadway production of Waitress. He subsequently played the role in the West End production of the musical starring alongside Sara Bareilles.

In 2021, Creel appeared in two episodes of American Horror Stories opposite Matt Bomer and Sierra McCormick on FX on Hulu.

On August 29, 2021, Creel was featured in the Public Broadcasting Service (PBS) network's aired concert for the musical Wicked which was hosted by Kristin Chenoweth and Idina Menzel. Other featured artists were Rita Moreno, Cynthia Erivo, Ariana DeBose, Ali Stroker, Amber Riley, Mario Cantone, Jennifer Nettles, Stephanie Hsu, Alex Newell, Isaac Cole Powell and Gabrielle Ruiz performing many of the musical's numbers.

Also in 2021, Creel performed in a self-described 'concert-cal' called Walk on Through: Confessions of a Museum Novice, for which Creel was commissioned to write and perform the book, music, and lyrics by the Metropolitan Museum of Art. Creel has spoken at length on various podcasts about working on this piece before and during the COVID-19 pandemic. 

In May 2022, Creel appeared as The Wolf and Cinderella's Prince in the New York City Center Encores! production and subsequent Broadway revival in June of Into the Woods. He left the production July 23 for two weeks and was filled in for by Cheyenne Jackson and understudy Jason Forbach. He came back for a month and then left again on September 4 for 10 days and was filled in for by Andy Karl, He returned to the production September 16 and stayed with the cast through its closing date January 8, 2023. During the Broadway run he would star opposite Bareilles, Karl, Joshua Henry, Phillipa Soo, Brian d'Arcy James, Patina Miller, Stephanie J. Block, Krysta Rodriguez, Denée Benton, Julia Lester, Sebastian Arcelus, Montego Glover, Diane Phelan, and Joaquina Kalukango. He will reprise these roles in the 2023 national tour opposite Glover, Block, Arcelus, Forbach, and Phelan.

Personal life 
Creel is gay. He is a regular on the LGBT RFamilyVacations cruise with Rosie O'Donnell. He is also one of the founders, with Rory O'Malley and Jenny Kanelos, of Broadway Impact, an LGBT activist group that mobilized the New York theatre community in the pursuit of marriage equality. He is an alumnus of Findlay First Edition Show Choir.

Creel took a temporary leave from Hello, Dolly! in March 2018 to recover from back surgery.

Acting credits

Theatre 
Adapted from About The Artists and Broadway World.

Television

Other works 

 2016: The Ceiling Fan (producer) • short film

Discography

Solo discography 
Albums
 2006: Goodtimenation (Creel/Roth)
 2012: Get Out (self-released)

EPs
 2010: Quiet (self-released); No. 44 at the Billboard's Top Heatseekers

Singles
 2011: "Noise (Equality Now)"
 2012: "Whitney Houston"

Guest appearances
 2002: "Lullaby of Broadway" with Marc Kudisch & David Nehls from Broadway Romances Manhattan
 2005: "'Til Then" from ZEITGEIST by Dan Lipton
 2007: "Young at Heart" from Over the Rainbow (Universal)
 2010: "Greenwich Time" from Love on a Summer Afternoon: Songs of Sam Davis (PS Classics)
 2017: "Christmas Broadway Bus Stop" with Laura Bell Bundy & Eden Espinosa
 2019: "Do You Hear the Bells?" with The Laurie Berkner Band from Waiting For The Elevator
 2020: "Witchcraft/I Put a Spell on You" from I Put a Spell on You (Broadway Records)
 2020: "If It Be Your Will" with Shoshana Bean & Shayna Steele from Sing Your Hallelujah (Shotime Records)
 2021: "Something Wonderful" from R&H Goes Pop!
 2021: "A Moment Forever Ago" from Central Park Season Two, The Soundtrack

Cast recordings 
 2002: Thoroughly Modern Millie (RCA Victor)
 2005: Hair (Actors Fund of America Benefit Recording) (Sh-K-Boom)
 2005: Bright Lights, Big City (Original Cast Recording) (Sh-K-Boom)
 2006: It's Only Life (A New Musical Revue) (PS Classics)
 2009: Hair (New Broadway Cast Recording) (Sh-K-Boom)
 2011: Fine and Dandy (World Premiere Recording) (PS Classics)
 2012: Flashdance - The Musical (Roth Music Inc.)
 2012: Fugitive Songs - A Song Cycle (Warner/Chappell)
 2016: She Loves Me (2016 Broadway Cast Recording) (Ghostlight Records)
 2017: Hello, Dolly! (New Broadway Cast Recording) (Masterworks Broadway)
 2019: Three Points of Contact (Very Intense Records)
 2019: The Man in the Ceiling (World Premiere Recording) (Ghostlight Records)
 2022: Into the Woods (2022 Broadway Cast Recording) (Craft Recordings)

Awards and nominations

References

External links

  (official website)
 
 
 [ Gavin Creel] at Billboard
 Gavin Creel on Discogs
 
 
 
 
 

1976 births
Living people
People from Findlay, Ohio
Male actors from Ohio
American gay actors
20th-century American male actors
21st-century American male actors
American male musical theatre actors
American male television actors
Tony Award winners
American film producers
LGBT people from Ohio
American LGBT musicians
American LGBT rights activists
Activists from Ohio
University of Michigan School of Music, Theatre & Dance alumni
Laurence Olivier Award winners
Findlay High School alumni